The first wave of Palestinian airborne arson attacks on Israel from Gaza Strip using airborne incendiary devices (incendiary balloons, incendiary kites, etc.) was launched in May 2018 during the 2018 Gaza border protests. These attacks are taking an advantage of the prevailing westwards winds which propel the airborne devices to Israel.

History
Since the beginning of the border riots the Palestinians increased the launches of incendiary kites. This primitive weapon is very cheap and it eluded detection by IDF surveillance and the Palestinians even managed to down with slingshots some IDF surveillance drones which were flying low to knock down the incendiary kites. By early May, hundreds of kites were sent to Israel since the beginning of the riots. Hundreds of acres of JNF forests suffered from arsons. The agriculture fields suffered half million of shekels of immediate damage and were facing long-lasting consequences because it would take several to restore the incinerated vegetation and soil. On May 2 kites caused a huge fire in the Be'eri Forest destroying several hundreds of dunams of forest.

Since May 7, 2018, the increasing use of a simpler method was reported: incendiary balloons carrying already-lit Molotov cocktail launched from the Gaza strip, in addition to the kites. The balloons have a longer range compared to kites. The Molotov cocktail causes the balloons to explode in midair, with burning material falling down. They caused fire in seven different locations, including a wheat field near Mefalsim and the Be'eri Forest. Occasional launches of the balloons were reported since early April, but since May they were used on a massive scale.

On May 11 IDF deployed new, small remote-controlled drones with knives on their wings to combat incendiary kites by cutting their guide lines, reportedly downing more than 40 kites in the first two days. However eventually this method proved ineffective.

Some balloons landed in residential areas of the Eshkol Regional Council and the Sdot Negev Regional Council, and no one was injured.

On July 9, 2018, in response to incendiary attacks, Israel closed the Kerem Shalom border crossing. On July 16, transfer of gas and fuel was stopped via the crossing.

Continued airborne arson attacks were reported in 2019, 2020 (in August 2020 fuel shipments to Gaza Strip were suspended again, in response of the resumed arson attacks. This caused the shut down of the only Gaza Strip power plant.), and 2021. In July 2021 Israel has reduced the fishing zone off Gaza by half, from 12 nautical miles to 6, in response to incendiary balloons launched into the Eshkol Regional Council area.

To combat the new form of terrorism, the only reliable method was constant monitoring and taking out the fires by hand. In February 2020, the Light Blade (Lahav or), a new laser weapon system was deployed as an operational experiment to the Gaza border against kites and balloons.

Motivation
A member of the Sons of Zouari group, responsible for many arson attacks, said in an interview: 
"We, as Palestinians, do not recognize these fields as belonging to the enemy. These are our lands, and the fields planted on them are not theirs by right. These are our lands, and we have the right to them. We say to them: We will not let you sow our lands and enjoy them. We will burn your fields, which you harvest to pay for the bullets that you use to shoot children and peaceful unarmed demonstrators."

Environmental damage
The resulting indiscriminate fires cause harm to wildlife, unique habitats and ecosystems. While agricultural fields are likely to recover quickly, this is not so for wildlife in protected areas. In 2018 Israel Nature and Parks Authority reported that about 10sq km of conservation area was affected. Much of the flora would return within a year, but the recovery of the complete ecosystem will take much longer. Reportedly, both larger (foxes, porcupines, jackals) and smaller (rodents, snakes, insects, etc.) animals have been killed in numbers.  Since the reserves adjacent to Gaza are relatively small, the relative impact of the fires is relatively large. There are concerns about the dwindling flora diversity after the fires, and the encroachment of the invasive species into the recovering areas.

Among the affected protected areas were the Be'eri Badlands Nature Reserve, Karmia Sands Nature Reserve, and Besor Stream Nature Reserve.

Of concern is air pollution due to massive fires. In addition of smoke due to arsons, tire burning during the protests have led to the release of toxic chemicals into the air. Burning forests increase the levels of CO2 in the atmosphere, i.e., contribute to the greenhouse effect.

References

External links

"Falcon sent from Gaza used for fire terrorism", ynet, July 18, 2018

Israeli–Palestinian conflict
Incendiary weapons
Gaza Strip